Frederick F. Brainard (February 17, 1892 – April 17, 1959) was an infielder in Major League Baseball. He played for the New York Giants between 1914–1916. He then played for various minor league teams, including a stint as player-manager of the International League Newark Bears in 1923 and 1924.

References

External links

1892 births
1959 deaths
Major League Baseball infielders
New York Giants (NL) players
Minor league baseball managers
Baseball players from Illinois
Sportspeople from Champaign, Illinois
Illinois Fighting Illini baseball players
Austin Senators players
Beaumont Oilers players
Providence Grays (minor league) players
Columbus Senators players
Newark Bears (IL) players
Wichita Falls Spudders players
Dallas Steers players
Buffalo Bisons (minor league) players